Craig Pond is a freshwater frozen pond  east of Dauphin Pond in the Labyrinth of Wright Valley, McMurdo Dry Valleys. It was named by the Advisory Committee on Antarctic Names (2004) after Scott D. Craig of the U.S. Fish and Wildlife Service, East Orland, ME, a member of a United States Antarctic Program party that field sampled Labyrinth ponds in 2003–04.

References 

Lakes of Victoria Land
McMurdo Dry Valleys